Mighty River may refer to:
The Mighty River Band, a Central PA music artist that pays homage to The Grateful Dead.  www.TheMightyRiverBand.com
 "Mighty River" (song), a 2017 song by Mary J. Blige from the film Mudbound
 "Mighty River", a 2002 song by bluegrass/jam band Railroad Earth from the album Bird in a House
 Mighty River Power (now known as Mercury Energy), a New Zealand electrical power company
 "Mighty Rivers" (Kylie Minogue song), from the 2010 album Aphrodite

See also 
 Mighty Rivers (disambiguation)